Marigona Dragusha (born 23 September 1990), also known as Gona Dragusha, is a Kosovar model and beauty queen who placed as the 2nd runner-up at the Miss Universe 2009 pageant. Dragusha won her national title, Miss Universe Kosovo, on 4 April 2009.
 
Besides her native Albanian language, Dragusha speaks English and Spanish.

References

External links
Miss Kosovo Universe 2009

Kosovo Albanians
Living people
Miss Universe 2009 contestants
Kosovan beauty pageant winners
1990 births
People from Pristina
21st-century Albanian models
Albanian female models